This is a list of railway stations in Switzerland located at an elevation over 1,200 metres above sea level. Switzerland includes most of the highest railways of Europe and therefore also includes its highest railway stations, both underground and open-air, on dead-end rail and on rail crossing. With the notable exception of the region of Graubünden, where are some of the highest European towns connected to railways, most of these stations are on railways that primarily carry tourists and are not used by commuters.

In the list are indicated the elevation, municipality, canton, railway and nearest location, inhabited or not.

For a list of the highest railways, see List of mountain railways in Switzerland. Note that this list does not include funicular nor any cable transport related facilities. For a list of funiculars, see List of funiculars in Switzerland. For a list of aerial tramways, see List of aerial tramways in Switzerland.

Main list

See also
Rail transport in Switzerland
List of funiculars in Switzerland
List of buildings and structures in Switzerland above 3000 m
List of highest railway stations in Europe

Notes

References
Swisstopo topographic maps

Railway stations
Railway stations in Switzerland
Lists of railway stations in Europe